M. V. Vishnu Namboothiri was a teacher, folk art researcher and author from Kerala, India. He was considered an authoritative source of information on Theyyam and other traditional art forms of North Malabar. He received several awards including awards from Kerala Sahitya Akademi, Kerala Folklore Academy and Kerala Sangeetha Nataka Academy.

Biography
Vishnu Namboothiri was born on October 25, 1939 to Mithale Vattaparam Illath Subramanian Namboothiri and Draupadi Antarjanam in Kunnaru, Ramantali in present-day Kannur District of Kerala. After completing his graduation in Malayalam, he started his professional career as a primary teacher in Malayalam and also became a teacher at high school and higher secondary levels. He has served as a Malayalam teacher at Kannur University's Kanhangad P Memorial Campus and as Head of the Malayalam Department at Kaladi Sreesankaracharya Sanskrit University's Payyannur Center. He also served as a Sarvavijnanakosam advisory committee member and research guide at Kozhikode, Kaladi, Kannur and MG universities. He retired from Ramantali Govt High School. He was also the former chairman of Kerala Folklore Academy.

Personal life and death
Vishnu Namboothiri and his wife Suvarnini have three children, Subramanian, Lalithambika and Muralidharan. He died on March 9, 2019, at Payyannur, Kerala. In the obituary of his death, the then Kerala Chief Minister Pinarayi Vijayan said that Vishnu Namboothiri was one of the pioneers of folklore study and research in Kerala.

Career as Folkorist
Vishnu Namboothiri has done many years of research on kavus and theyyams and other religious and folk art forms of Kerala. He has authored 69 books in the genre folklore, including Keralathile Nadodi vijnanathinu oru mukhavura (meaning An Introduction to the Folklore of Kerala), Folklore chinthakal, Puravritha padanam (study on myths of Kerala), Namboothiri bhasha shabdakosham (a dictionary on language of Namboothiris), Mukhadarshan, Pulluvanpattum Nagaradhanayum (book on Pulluvan Paattu and snake worship in Kerala), Mandravadavum Mantravadappattum (book on traditional black magic and black magic songs in Kerala), Vannanum konthronpattum (book on folk music of Kerala), Pulayarude pattukal (book on folk songs of Pulayar community in Kerala), Kothamuri, Thottam pattukal oru padanam (a study on Thottam Pattu), Theyyavum thirayum, Theyyam, Nadodivijnjaneeyam, Poorakkali (a study on Poorakkali), Gaveshana Praveshika (meaning research entry), Keralathile Nadan sangeetham (a book on folk music of Kerala), Thottam, Nadanpattu Manjari, Pottanattam, Vivaranathmaka folklore granthasoochi (descriptive folklore bibliography) etc.

Awards and honors
Kerala Sahitya Akademi Award (IC Chacko Endowment) 1998 for his Dictionary of Folklore
Kerala Sangeetha Nataka Akademi Award 2008 (Folk Art Research)
P K Kalan Award of (2009) instituted by the Kerala government
First award of Kerala Folklore Academy for Comprehensive Contribution in folklore textbooks
Pattathanam Award 1998 (in recognition of over a quarter of a century of services in the field of folklore studies)
S. Guptan Nair Memorial Award 2011
Kadtanath Udayavarmaraja Award 2012
Kalamezhut Study Center Award
Vijnanpeeth Award
Kerala State Biodiversity Award
Abu Dhabi Sakthi Award (2015)
Senior Fellowship of Department of Culture, Government of India

References

1939 births
2019 deaths
Malayalam-language writers
Writers from Kerala
Indian folklorists
People from Kannur district
Recipients of the Abu Dhabi Sakthi Award
Recipients of the Kerala Sahitya Akademi Award